Mount Sara Teodora is the broad ice-covered peak rising to 1389 m in Aristotle Mountains on Oscar II Coast in Graham Land.  It is situated in the southeast foothills of Madrid Dome, with its ice cap draining towards Starbuck Glacier to the northeast, Stubb Glacier to the east, Ambergris Glacier to the south, and Belogradchik Glacier to the southwest. The lower rocky ridges of Pippin Peaks, Chintulov and Valkosel spread out to the east-northeast, southeast and south direction respectively.

The feature is named after the Bulgarian queen Sara Teodora, 1349–1371.

Location
British mapping in 1976.

Maps
 British Antarctic Territory.  Scale 1:200000 topographic map.  DOS 610 Series, Sheet W 65 62.  Directorate of Overseas Surveys, Tolworth, UK, 1976.
 Antarctic Digital Database (ADD). Scale 1:250000 topographic map of Antarctica. Scientific Committee on Antarctic Research (SCAR), 1993–2016.

Notes

References
 Mount Sara Teodora. SCAR Composite Antarctic Gazetteer.
 Bulgarian Antarctic Gazetteer. Antarctic Place-names Commission. (details in Bulgarian, basic data in English)

External links
 Mount Sara Teodora. Copernix satellite image

Sara Teodora
Oscar II Coast
Bulgaria and the Antarctic